

Events 
October 2 – The Bull's Head Musical Society opens a Music Hall in Fishamble Street, Dublin, Ireland.
August 22–September 14 – George Frideric Handel composes his oratorio Messiah in London to a libretto compiled by Charles Jennens, completing the "Hallelujah Chorus" on September 6.
November 18 – George Frideric Handel arrives in Dublin to give a series of concerts having tried out the Messiah privately en route in Chester.
November 25 – Marguerite-Antoinette Couperin, the first female court musician at the French court, sells her official post to Bernard de Bury.
Johann Friedrich Agricola arrives in  Berlin to study musical composition under Johann Joachim Quantz.
Antonio Vivaldi leaves Venice for Vienna, but dies shortly after his arrival.
19-year-old Jiří Antonín Benda is given the post of second violinist at the Berlin court of King Frederick II of Prussia.
William Hogarth produces an engraving entitled The Enraged Musician.

Classical music 
Girolamo Abos – Magnificat à quarto concertato con strum.
Carl Philipp Emanuel Bach 
Harpsichord Concerto in A major, H.411
Symphony in G major, H.648
Johann Sebastian Bach – Goldberg Variations, BWV 988
Joseph Bodin de Boismortier – 6 Flute Sonatas, Op. 91
Michel Corrette – Nouveau Livre de noëls
Jean-Baptiste Dupuits – 6 Sonatas for Vielle and Harpsichord, Op. 3
Willem de Fesch – 8 Concertos in 7 Parts, Op. 10
Baldassare Galuppi – Confitebor tibi Domine in C major, B.II.2
Christoph Graupner 
Trio Sonata in E major, GWV 208
Flute Sonata in G major, GWV 708
George Frideric Handel  
Messiah composed.
Quel fior che all'alba ride, HWV 192 (duet)
Overture in D major, HWV 424
Johann Adolph Hasse – 12 Flute Concertos, Op. 3
Friedrich Wilhelm Marpurg – Pièces de Clavecin
Jean-Philippe Rameau – Pieces de Clavecin en Concerts
Georg Philipp Telemann – 24 Odes, TWV 25:86-109

Opera
Tomaso Albinoni – Artamene
Andrea Bernasconi – Demofoonte
Baldassare Galuppi – Penelope
Christoph Willibald Gluck –  Artaserse
Karl Heinrich Graun – Rodelinda regina de' Longobardi, GraunWV B:I:6
George Frideric Handel – Deidamia, HWV 42 (composed 1740)
Johann Adolph Hasse – Numa Pompilio
Niccolò Jommelli – Semiramide riconosciuta
Giovanni Battista Lampugnani – Arsace

Publications 

 Johann Sebastian Bach – Clavier-Übung IV (Nuremberg: Balthasar Schmid), now known as the Goldberg Variations.
 The Cocquiel Manuscript, B-Br Ms II 3326 Mus, containing sacred music by various composers (including Jacob La Fosse and Abraham van den Kerckhoven)

Methods and theory writings 

 Michel Corrette – Méthode pour apprendre le violoncelle, Op. 24
 Antoine Terrasson – Historique sur la vielle
 Carlo Tessarini – Gramatica di musica

Births 
February 8 – André Grétry, composer (died 1813)
 February 9 
Joseph Corfe (died 1820)
Henri-Joseph Rigel, composer (died 1799)
April 17 – Johann Gottlieb Naumann (died 1801)
 May 23 – Andrea Luchesi, composer (died 1801)
 July 17 – Suzette Defoye, opera singer and ballerina
July 27 – François-Hippolyte Barthélémon, violinist and composer (died 1808)
August 31 – Jean-Paul-Égide Martini, composer (died 1816)
September 11 – Johann Jakob Engel (died 1802)
September 25 – Wenzel Pichl, singer, violinist and composer (died 1805)
November 27 – Jean-Pierre Duport (died 1818)
date unknown
Franz Xaver Hammer, gambist, cellist and composer (died 1817)
Giacomo Rust (died 1786)
Anna Brita Wendelius, singer and member of the Swedish Royal Academy of Music (died 1804).

Deaths 
January 5 – Ann Turner Robinson, English soprano
February 13 – Johann Fux, composer and theorist (born 1660)
March 17 – Jean-Baptiste Rousseau (born 1671)
June 21 – Joseph-Hector Fiocco, Flemish violinist and composer (born 1703)
July 28 – Antonio Vivaldi, composer (born 1678)
August – David Owen, Welsh harpist (born 1712)
August 24 – Gabriel-Vincent Thévenard, French operatic baritone (born 1669)
September 3 (or after) – Carlo Francesco Cesarini (born 1666)
September 7 – Henri Desmarets, French composer of sacred music (born 1661)
probable – Francesco Scarlatti, composer (born 1666)

References 

 
18th century in music
Music by year